The decathlon is an athletic event combining ten track and field events.

Decathlon may also refer to:

 Decathlon (retailer), a global sporting goods retail store chain
 Decathlon (horse), an American Thoroughbred racehorse
 Academic Decathlon, an American academic competition
 American Champion Decathlon, a light aircraft

Video games
 Decathlon (1992 video game), a NES game developed by C&E
 Bruce Jenner's World Class Decathlon (1996)
 Daley Thompson's Decathlon (1984)
 Olympic Decathlon (1981) or Microsoft Decathlon (1982)
 The Activision Decathlon, reissued as Decathlon by Firebird

See also 

 DecAthlete (video game), a 1994 arcade game and its console conversions